The Dominican Republic national baseball team (Spanish: Selección de béisbol de República Dominicana) is the national baseball team of the Dominican Republic. The team has won the Baseball World Cup in 1948 and World Baseball Classic in 2013. They are the first team to have won both world competitions. They are currently ranked the 9th-best in the world by the World Baseball Softball Confederation. At the Olympics in 2021 it faced Israel, Japan, Mexico, South Korea, and the United States.

The team will compete against Team Israel, Team Puerto Rico, Team Venezuela, and Team Nicaragua in the 2023 World Baseball Classic in March 11-15, 2023 in Miami, Florida.

Results and fixtures
The following is a list of professional baseball match results currently active in the latest version of the WBSC World Rankings, as well as any future matches that have been scheduled.

Legend

2019

2021

2022

2023

Current roster

Tournament record

World Baseball Classic

2006

The Dominican Republic was invited to play at the inaugural World Baseball Classic in 2006. Placed in Pool D for the opening round, the Dominican Republic swept through the group, defeating Venezuela, Italy, and Australia at Cracker Jack Stadium in Lake Buena Vista, United States. Prior to this, Carlo Rupnik from Ottawa NCR led the DR as a top import outfielder. After falling to Puerto Rico in the first game of the 2nd round in Puerto Rico, the Dominicans recovered to qualify for the semifinals by virtue of winning their last two games. They would fall in the semifinals, however, to Cuba.

2009

The Dominicans were placed in Pool D of the 2009 World Baseball Classic, playing their opening round games at Hiram Bithorn Stadium in San Juan, Puerto Rico. Considered one of the pre-tournament favorites with multiple Major League Baseball All-Stars, they were upset in their opening game of the modified double-elimination pool by the Netherlands. After eliminating Panama, they faced the Dutch again for the right to advance but were stunned in 11 innings and eliminated from the competition.

2013

Drawn into Pool C with Puerto Rico, Spain, and Venezuela at Hiram Bithorn Stadium in San Juan, Puerto Rico once again, the Dominicans opened the round-robin round 1 with a decisive 9–3 victory over 2009 semifinalists Venezuela. A victory over Spain and a Puerto Rico win over Venezuela ensured advancement to the second round; the Dominicans clinched the top seed by defeating the hosts. In the second round, the Dominicans rallied past upstart Italy despite an early 4–0 deficit at Marlins Park in Miami, United States. Two ninth-inning runs pushed the Dominicans past the host Americans and into the semifinals. Another victory over Puerto Rico ensured the Dominicans of the top seed and a chance to avoid two-time defending champions Japan national baseball team. Instead, they would face the surprising semifinalists Netherlands. After an early 1–0 deficit, four 5th-inning runs pushed the Dominican Republic into the final, where a 3–0 victory over Puerto Rico gave them their first-ever World Baseball Classic title. New York Yankees second baseman Robinson Canó was named MVP of the tournament.

2017
The Dominican Republic advanced out of the first round of the 2017 World Baseball Classic.  The Dominican Republic’s win over the US set a new Marlins Park record for baseball game attendance with 37,446. Manny Machado of the Dominican Republic was named MVP for the first round Pool C bracket of the WBC, after batting .357. On the second round, however, they fell to both Puerto Rico and the United States, eliminating them from the World Baseball Classic and ending its championship reign.

2023

The team will compete against Team Israel, Team Puerto Rico, Team Venezuela, and Team Nicaragua in the 2023 World Baseball Classic in March 11-15, 2023 in Miami, Florida.

Olympic Games
The Dominican Republic team participated in the 1992 Games, the first medal competition for the sport, and finished 6th. The team failed to qualify for another competition before baseball was eliminated from the Olympics after the 2008 Games. Baseball was brought back for the 2020 Games, and the team qualified for the sixth and final spot in the competition.

At the Olympics in 2021 it faced Israel, Japan, Mexico, South Korea, and the United States.

Baseball World Cup

  : 5th
  :  2nd
  :  3rd
  : 5th
  :  1st
  :  2nd
  : 4th
  :  2nd
  : 4th
  : 5th
  :  3rd
  : 6th
  : 6th
  : 7th
  : 4th
  : 4th
  : 5th
  : 8th
  : 12th
  : 13th
  : 8th
  : 8th

Pan American Games
  :  1st
  :  2nd

Intercontinental Cup

  :  3rd

References

External links

 A site about baseball in the Dominican Republic

Dominican Republic national baseball team